The 1989 Caribbean Cup (known as the Shell Caribbean Cup for sponsorship reasons) was the first edition of the Caribbean Cup, the football championship of the Caribbean, one of the CONCACAF zones. The final stage was hosted by Barbados.

The tournament was sponsored by Shell Company Ltd. after the tournament was first thought of by employees of Shell Antilles and Gulanas Ltd. Barbados received a bye to the final round as they were hosts of the competition and Shell (based in Barbados) felt that it was better suited to host the tournament as Barbados have an international airport.

Qualifying tournament
Each group winner would qualify along with the two best runners-up.
 qualified for the final tournament as hosts.
 were disqualified due to failure to pay FIFA fines.

Group A

Group B

Group C

Notes:
Guadeloupe won the group on goal-difference, while Antigua was eliminated as the worst runner-up. Both teams had three wins and one defeat.

Final tournament

Group A

Group B

Final

Prize money 

The following prize money was awarded to national association:

Winner: $10k 
Runner-up: $5k 
Third-place: $4k 
Fourth-place: $3k

References

External links 
 RSSSF archive

Caribbean Cup
Caribbean Cup
International sports competitions hosted by Barbados
Caribbean Championship, 1989
Football competitions in Barbados